Edie McKee Harper (March 29, 1922 – January 10, 2010) was an American photographer, artist and wildlife conservationist.  Harper made her living as an artist for 60 years, working in many mediums, including sculptures, paintings, textiles, jewelry and lithographs, etc.

Early life
Edith Riley K. "Edie" Mckee Harper was born March 29, 1922 in Kansas City, Kansas. Harper was an only child and her family moved frequently in her early years. Eventually, the family settled in Cincinnati, Ohio after her father got hired for a position with Procter & Gamble.  Harper graduated from Wyoming High School in 1939.

World War II and school
Harper attended the Art Academy of Cincinnati for formal art training, where she took printmaking with Maybelle and Wilson Stamper and color theory with Josef Albers. She met her future husband, the artist Charley Harper in 1940 on their first day at the Art Academy of Cincinnati. When WWII came, Harper contributed to the war effort as an Army Corps of Engineers photographer, while Charley Harper was drafted into the Army.  She took photographs of different structures on the home front, such as hydro dams and cement test samples. Edie processed the film in the lab for the Corps of Engineers. Photographs from her war work became highly acclaimed and were shown in an exhibition at the Cincinnati Contemporary Art Center in 1961. After the war ended, both Edie and Charley were able to continue their studies and graduate from the Art Academy of Cincinnati in 1947.  They married shortly after graduation and eventually had one son, also an artist, Brett Harper.  The newly-minted Harpers drove across America on a six-month honeymoon, camping and creating artworks of the places that they visited, like the Grand Canyon. This period inspired a life-long focus on wildlife for both artists for the remainder of their careers.

Career
Following the war, Harper continued to work in photography, but experimented in many alternate mediums, like pottery, textiles, jewelry, sculpture, painting and lithography. Her work is often over-shadowed by her famous husband, possibly because of the similar themes and graphic style. She has been called "the most under-appreciated photographer in Cincinnati," by curator David Lusenhop Jr.

List of works
Harper's artwork spans many media, from her black and white photographs from World War II to her acrylic paintings of cats and New and Old Testament readings. Some of Edie's more well-known works include:
 Little Red Riding Hood- 1940s
 Maestro, c. 1945 by Edie Harper, oil on board, 21.25 × 12"{
 1947 self-portrait
 Woodland Fauna, mural, 1947–1948
 Untitled (123), c. 1950 by Edie Harper. oil on canvas, 18 × 24¼"
 Noazark (1975)
 Third Kind
 Matador
 Little David
 Nine Tails

Art shows
 Solo photograph exhibition, 1961, the Contemporary Arts Center, Cincinnati.
 "Cincinnati modern art & design at mid-century", 2002, at the Aronoff Center for the Arts
 "Graphic Content", 2006, at Cincinnati's Contemporary Arts Center
 "Minimal Realism: Charley and Edie Harper," August 2007 at the Cincinnati Art Museum
 "Harper Ever After," 2013, at the Cincinnati Art Museum
 "Modern Cat", June 2016, at the Cincinnati Art Museum
 "E is for Edie" at The Carnegie, first solo retrospective

Publications
 Edie Harper Coloring Book
 Edie was the illustrator for the children's book, My Nose Is Running, by Louise Bonnett-Rampersaud.

References

Further reading

External links 
 

American women photographers
Nature photographers
Photographers from Kansas
1922 births
2010 deaths
People from Kansas City, Kansas
Art Academy of Cincinnati alumni
United States Army personnel of World War II
20th-century American women
21st-century American women